A processional hymn is a chant, hymn or other music sung during the Procession, usually at the start of a Christian service, although occasionally during the service itself. The procession usually contains members of the clergy and the choir walking behind the processional cross. Occasionally, a service will also contain a recessional hymn, although in the Protestant tradition this is usually an organ voluntary.

The genre first appears in the early Middle Ages, and is a distinct genre from breviary hymns, often containing a refrain. With its longer cathedrals and churches, England was particularly rich in these and several are to be found in the Sarum Processional.

In The English Hymnal nos. 613 to 640 are described as "Processional" and nos. 641 to 646 are "Suitable for use in procession". The processional hymns include "Of the Father's Heart Begotten" (Corde natus ex parentis, by Prudentius), "Ride On, Ride On in Majesty!"(by H. H. Milman), "Hail thee, Festival Day!" (Salve, festa dies, by Venantius Fortunatus) and "Jerusalem, my happy home" (by F.B.P. c. 1580).

See also
 Recessional hymn

References

Hymnology
Order of Mass